Joe Jefferson Clubhouse is a cabin located in Saddle River, Bergen County, New Jersey, United States. The building was built in 1925 and was added to the National Register of Historic Places on August 29, 1986.

See also
National Register of Historic Places listings in Bergen County, New Jersey

External links
 Google Street View of Joe Jefferson Clubhouse

References

Buildings and structures completed in 1925
Buildings and structures in Bergen County, New Jersey
Clubhouses on the National Register of Historic Places in New Jersey
National Register of Historic Places in Bergen County, New Jersey
Saddle River, New Jersey
New Jersey Register of Historic Places